Jafar Iqbal (born 27 September 1999) is a Bangladeshi professional footballer who can play on either wings preferably on the left. He currently plays for Dhaka Mohamedan Sporting in the Bangladesh Football Premier League.

Club career

Arambagh KS
Jafar started his professional career in 2016 when he was signed by Saiful Bari Titu with Arambagh KS. On August 9, 2016 Jafar scored his first professional league goal against Brothers Union during 2016 Bangladesh Football Premier League. Jafar scored a cracker against Team BJMC in the semi final of 2016 Bangladesh Federation Cup and helped his team to reach up in the final. His combination with Mohammad Abdullah worked superbly for Arambagh KS as they played final of 2016 Bangladesh Federation Cup and finished the premier league at sixth position.

Chittagong Abahani
After a successful season with Arambagh KS, in April 2017 Jafar joined new giant of local football Chittagong Abahani. However, under coach Saiful Bari Titu Jafar could not cement a starting spot in the team and only scored a single goal all season, which cam against relegation threatened Team BJMC.

Saif SC
On 10 December 2019, Jafar joined the country's new corporate giants Saif Sporting Club. However, it was another disappointing season for him, scoring only a single goal in 17 league appearance, and in turn losing his place in the senior national team.

Mohammedan SC
On 10 December 2020, Jafar joined Dhaka giants Mohammedan SC, from Saif SC for a transfer fee of Tk 1.5 lakh. The deal was the first instance of a transfer fee being paid in Bangladeshi club football.
 
Jafar was ruled out for six week after injuring his knee during an 2021–22 Independence Cup game against Saif SC.

International career

Youth
Jafar made his Bangladesh U18 debut against India during 2017 SAFF U-18 Championship. He led his team to a stunning 4–3 win overcoming three goals deficit at the break against India U18 with a superb brace both coming from header. 

Jafar was the Golden boot award winner in 2017 SAFF U-18 Championship for scoring 5 goals from 4 matches. He also had an assist in that sensational match against India. Since making his top tier debut for Arambagh KS in 2016 domestic season, he has been considered to hold a bright future for Bangladesh football.

Jafar made his Olympic team debut against Nepal U23 on July 11, 2017 during an International friendly match.

Senior team
Jafar made his senior team debut against Maldives on September 1, 2016 during an International friendly match. He scored his first goal against Laos on 27 March 2018.

International goals

Bangladesh U20

National team
Scores and results list Bangladesh's goal tally first.

Awards
 Kool-BSPA Footballer of the Year: 2017

References

Living people
1999 births
Bangladeshi footballers
Bangladesh international footballers
Bangladesh youth international footballers
Association football wingers
Footballers at the 2018 Asian Games
Asian Games competitors for Bangladesh
Bangladesh Football Premier League players
Mohammedan SC (Dhaka) players
Arambagh KS players
Saif SC players
Abahani Limited (Chittagong) players